104 Tauri (104 Tau) is the Flamsteed designation for a star in the equatorial constellation of Taurus. It has an apparent magnitude of 4.92, which is bright enough to be seen with the naked eye. Based upon parallax measurements, this star is located about 50 light-years from the Sun. It is moving further from the Sun with a heliocentric radial velocity of +20 km/s.

This star has a stellar classification of G4 V, which suggests it is an ordinary G-type main-sequence star that is generating energy through hydrogen fusion at its stellar core. It is an estimated 10 billion years old and is spinning with a projected rotational velocity of 10 km/s. The star has about the same mass as the Sun, with 1.6 times the Sun's radius.

The apparent brightness of this star indicates that it is a young, population I star. However, the chemical abundances in its outer atmosphere tell a different story, suggesting that it is a population II star with an age of 12−13 billion years. This discrepancy may indicate that the star has undergone a period of mass accretion. Possible scenarios indicate that the star has either undergone a merger with a close companion, or else interacted with the progenitor cloud of the nearby open cluster NGC 2516.

The star displays convincing evidence for an infrared excess, suggesting the presence of a circumstellar debris disk of dust.

References

Taurus (constellation)
G-type main-sequence stars
Double stars
Tauri, 104
Tauri, m
0188
032923
23835
1656
BD+18 0779